Charles M. Moses (25 August 1851–?) was an American paymaster and politician from Biddeford, Maine. Born in either Augusta, Maine or Limerick, Maine, he was the paymaster of the Saco Water Power Company for approximately 25 years. He was Mayor of Biddeford in 1888 and 1890. In 1898, he was appointed appraiser of the Port of Portland and a year later, in 1899, he was appointed to the lucrative position of Collector of the Port of Portland.

References

1862 births
Year of death missing
Maine Republicans
Mayors of Biddeford, Maine
Collectors of the Port of Portland (Maine)
Paymasters